Parupalli Ramakrishnayya Pantulu (1883–1951) was a Carnatic vocalist. 
He is better known as a Guru producing maestros like M. Balamuralikrishna and many more renowned musicians.

Sri Pantulu was a direct descendant of the śishya parampara of Saint Thyagaraja. In the order of Guru Parampara, the musician is directly the fourth in the line of disciples of saint Tyagaraja, after Susarla Dakshinamoorthy Sastry, Akumadugula Manambuchavadi Venkata Subbayya and Saint Tyagaraja.

Born on 15 December 1882 to Smt. Mangamma and Sri . Seshachalam at Village Srikakulam, Andhra Pradesh, Sri. Pantulu garu (Garu - an honorific title). After formal education and upanayanam (formal coming-of-age ceremony), took up the job of Thanedar - a village law enforcement official in the principality of Challapalli  in the Krishna district of Andhra Pradesh

References

Male Carnatic singers
Carnatic singers
Telugu playback singers
Indian male playback singers
1883 births
1951 deaths
20th-century Indian male classical singers
Singers from Andhra Pradesh
Film musicians from Karnataka
Singers from British India